Marcus Fischer (born 12 August 1980) is a German footballer who plays for TSG 1919 Dülmen.

Career
He spent two seasons in the Bundesliga with VfL Bochum.

References

1980 births
Living people
German footballers
VfL Bochum players
VfL Bochum II players
FC Gütersloh 2000 players
SV Elversberg players
SC Preußen Münster players
Sportfreunde Lotte players
Bundesliga players
Association football forwards
People from Wittenberg
Footballers from Saxony-Anhalt
FC Eintracht Rheine players